The 1941 Mercer Bears football team was an American football team that represented Mercer University as a member of the Dixie Conference during the 1941 college football season. In their first year under head coach Bobby Hooks, the team compiled a 3–6 record.

Schedule

References

Mercer
Mercer Bears football seasons
Mercer Bears football